Elysia rufescens is a species of sea slug, a marine gastropod mollusc in the family Plakobranchidae. This sea slug resembles a nudibranch but is not classified in that order of gastropods, instead belonging to a closely related clade, Sacoglossa, the "sap-sucking" sea slugs. This species was first described by Pease from Tahiti in 1871.

Description
The parapodia are somewhat convoluted and have dark blue edges and a submarginal orange line. The rhinophores are rolled and have blunt, greyish ends.<ref name=SSF>[http://www.seaslugforum.net/showall/elysrufe Elysia rufescens (Pease, 1871)] The Sea Slug Forum. Retrieved 2012-01-27.</ref>

DistributionElysia rufescens is found in the Pacific Ocean. Its range includes the coastlines of South Africa, Réunion, Thailand, Myanmar, the Philippines, Japan, Guam, Samoa, Tahiti, Hawaii and Australia.

BiologyElysia rufescens feeds on green filamentous algae such as Bryopsis pennata'', which it rasps with each of a series of rachidian teeth.

References

Plakobranchidae
Gastropods described in 1871